The Myanmar Board of Examinations is a governmental body that administers national examinations and sets standardized qualifications. The Board administers the University Entrance Examination. The Board was formed in 1972, replacing the Commissioner for Examinations, which had overseen both civil service and high school examinations.

See also
Education in Burma

References

Educational organisations based in Myanmar
Government agencies of Myanmar
Government agencies established in 1972